The 2007 mid-year rugby union tests (also known as the Summer Internationals in the Northern Hemisphere) refers to the Rugby union Test matches played during June and May 2007. These are played in the Southern Hemisphere, and include all Tests hosted by Argentina, Australia, New Zealand and South Africa outside the 2007 Tri-Nations. The Tests are being used by many countries as their last opportunity to prepare for the 2007 Rugby World Cup in France. For Australia, New Zealand and South Africa it is used as preparation for the 2007 Tri-Nations. The only match listed here with a Northern Hemisphere winner was Italy's victory over Uruguay.

Overview

Series

Other tours

Fixtures

See also
Mid-year rugby union test series
2007 Rugby World Cup warm-up matches
2007 end-of-year rugby union tests
2007 Churchill Cup
2007 IRB Pacific Nations Cup
2007 IRB Nations Cup

References

External links
 Fixtures on rugby.com.au
 Fixtures on allblacks.com
 Fixtures on SArugby.co.za

2005
2006–07 in European rugby union
2007–08 in European rugby union
2007 in Oceanian rugby union
2007 in South American rugby union
2007 in North American rugby union
2007 in African rugby union